Southern Cross Media Group Limited, doing business as Southern Cross Austereo, is an Australian media company which operates broadcast radio and television stations. It is the largest radio broadcaster in Australia, operating 86 radio stations, and has a reach into every state and territory.

The company is headquartered in South Melbourne. It was founded in 2004 as a subsidiary of Macquarie Bank for the purpose of acquiring regional radio stations, before expanding into television broadcasting in 2007 with the acquisition of Southern Cross Broadcasting. It also operates the LISTNR platform in Australia.

History

2004–05: RG Capital & DMG Regional Radio acquisitions
On 3 June 2004, Macquarie Bank announced it would acquire RG Capital Radio for $173 million, gaining control of 36 radio stations in New South Wales, Queensland, Victoria and Tasmania. The Federal Court of Australia approved the acquisition in August 2004, with the stations to be operated through the company's Regional Media Limited subsidiary, trading as Macquarie Regional RadioWorks. The acquisition was finalised on 1 September 2004.

On 3 September 2004, Macquarie Bank announced its acquisition of DMG Radio Australia's regional radio assets. The $193.5 million deal included 57 regional stations, with DMG retaining Hot 91.1 Sunshine Coast and Star 104.5 Gosford alongside its metropolitan assets. This increased Regional Media's reach into South Australia and Western Australia, initially controlling 93 radio stations and becoming the largest commercial radio network in Australia. However, as the Broadcasting Services Act 1992 prevents companies from controlling more than two commercial radio stations in a regional market, Regional Media was required to divest radio stations in Albury, Cairns, Mackay, Rockhampton/Gladstone and Townsville. On 1 September 2005, 2AY Albury was acquired by Ace Radio, while six stations in the remaining five markets were sold to Prime Television.

On 17 November 2005 the company was restructured into a triple-stapled structure consisting of an Australian-based private company and trust, and an additional private company based in Bermuda. Macquarie Media Group was in turn publicly listed on the Australian Securities Exchange, but with majority control retained by Macquarie Bank. In December, Macquarie Bank announced an AU$1.19 billion deal to acquire a 40% stake in Taiwanese cable television provider Taiwan Broadband Communications from equity firm The Carlyle Group, 60% of which would be financed by Macquarie Media Group. In March 2008, the company divested its stake to the Macquarie Korea Opportunities Fund in a $400 million deal.

2006–08: American Consolidated Media & Southern Cross acquisitions
By 2006, Macquarie Regional RadioWorks was increasingly networking news and programming on its 86 radio stations from a series of hubs in Bendigo, Bunbury, the Gold Coast and Townsville. This was criticised by a number of politicians, including Nationals MPs Paul Neville and Barnaby Joyce. In response, the Minister for Communications Helen Coonan introduced the Broadcasting Services Amendment (Media Ownership) Act 2006, including requiring each commercial radio licence to produce 4.5 hours of 'locally significant' content each business day commencing from 1 January 2008. This was later relaxed to 3 hours for most stations, with exemptions for smaller stations.

In November 2006, Macquarie Media Group purchased a 13.8% stake in Southern Cross Broadcasting, acquiring 10 million shares for AU$195 million. On 25 January 2007, the company's interests expanded into the United States, with the acquisition of newspaper publisher American Consolidated Media for US$80 million (AU$102 million).

On 3 July 2007, Macquarie Media Group announced a takeover bid of Southern Cross Broadcasting, offering AU$17.41 per share for a total value of $1.35 billion. Under the deal, Macquarie would assume Southern Cross Broadcasting's regional television assets – Southern Cross Television, affiliated with the Seven Network; Southern Cross Ten, affiliated with Network Ten; and Tasmanian Digital Television, a joint-venture with WIN Corporation. Its remaining assets, including metropolitan radio stations, Satellite Music Australia and Southern Star Group, were to be onsold to Fairfax Media for AU$520 million. In return, Macquarie would acquire nine regional radio stations from Fairfax – three in Queensland: 4BU and Hitz FM Bundaberg and River 94.9 Ipswich; and six in South Australia: 5AU and Magic 105.9 Port Augusta, 5CC and Magic 89.9 Port Lincoln, and 5RM and Magic 93.1 Renmark. The Australian Communications & Media Authority gave prior approval to the deal, with the caveat that 12 radio stations currently controlled by Macquarie would be sold pursuant to the Broadcasting Services Act 1992. On 17 October, the Australian Competition & Consumer Commission approved the deal, but ruled that the deal for Fairfax to sell nine radio stations to Macquarie would result in a "substantial lessening of competition".

On 5 November, Macquarie Media Group acquired Southern Cross Broadcasting, selling its non-television assets to Fairfax Media the following day. On 12 December, both parties abandoned negotiations for the South Australian and Queensland radio stations. On 14 March 2008, Macquarie divested 18 radio stations for AU$34.5 million. Nine Tasmanian stations were sold to Grant Broadcasters, with four Queensland stations sold to Smart Radio. 4AM Atherton was bought by Coastal Broadcasters Pty Ltd, owners of 4KZ and Kool FM Innisfail, while 3GG Gippsland and 4GC and Hot FM Charters Towers were sold to Resonate Broadcasting, a new entity formed by Austereo executives Guy Dobson and Rex Morris. While only one of Macquarie's two stations in Young, New South Wales were required to be sold, both 2LF and Star FM were sold to Broadcast Operations Group.

Following the Southern Cross Broadcasting acquisition, Macquarie's regional radio and television business commenced trading as Macquarie Southern Cross Media.

2009–10: Restructure
In August 2009, Macquarie Media Group posted a loss of $84.6 million in 2008-09, compared with a $273 million profit in the previous financial year. Despite lower revenue, the Group's Australian assets delivered a profit of $123.4 million, but ACM significant losses

In December 2009, MMG security holders voted in favour of a conversion from a triple-stapled structure to a single ASX-listed company. MMG was renamed Southern Cross Media Group with former RG Capital Radio CEO Rhys Holleran as the Chief Executive Officer.

Austereo

The company was founded by Paul Thompson, and when commercial FM broadcasting was introduced into Australia it acquired the licence for metropolitan Adelaide, South Australia; SAFM commenced transmission in September 1980. The next station to join the network was FOX FM in Melbourne, Victoria in 1986, eventually to be followed by 2Day FM in Sydney, New South Wales and 4BK in Brisbane, Queensland for which the company was successful in converting to the FM band in 1990. Austereo also purchased AM radio station 6IX in Perth, Western Australia with the intention of converting the station to FM. 6IX, which had been re-launched by Austereo as The Eagle 1080 AM, was consequently sold off after being outbid for either of the two new FM licences by rivals 6KY and 6PM, which Austereo now own.

1995 saw a monopolistic arrangement take place whereby Village Roadshow purchased the Hoyts owned Triple M network, and Triple M in turn merged with Austereo to form a single umbrella company.
 The merger was part of a single deal that was unpopular due to the fierce rivalry between the two radio networks, and the fact that Village Roadshow and Hoyts were also direct competitors in the film industry.

Merger
In March 2011, Southern Cross Media launched an A$714 million takeover bid of national radio broadcaster, the Austereo Group. On 6 April 2011 shareholders of the Austereo Group accepted the takeover bid, giving SCM a more than 90% share in the company. Southern Cross Media and Austereo merged in July 2011 to form Southern Cross Austereo.

Post-merger
On 23 August 2012, Guy Dobson (director of metro radio) was announced as Chief Officer of Content for the Southern Cross Austereo network, working across radio and television.

Brands

Television
Southern Cross Seven, sole affiliates of the Seven Network. These stations primarily brand themselves as "Channel Seven", following the Seven Network's generic branding.
Southern Cross Nine, sole affiliate of the Nine Network. These stations primarily brand themselves as "Channel Nine" in Spencer Gulf and Broken Hill, following the Nine Network's generic branding.
 Southern Cross 10, sole affiliates of Network 10. These stations brand themselves only as "Channel 10", following the Network 10's generic branding.

Radio
The format of each station is defined by one of two common formats:

Hit Network – plays adult hit music from the 1980s, 1990s, 2000s, 2010s and today targeted at those aged between 25 and 54 years old using various Hit Network brands in metropolitan and regional areas
Triple M Network – talkback and rock music format targeted at adults over 39, mainly on the AM and heritage FM stations

Agreements were reached between Southern Cross Austereo, DMG and Prime Television to ensure that existing brand names owned by DMG Radio in regional markets could continue to be used by both Southern Cross Austereo and Prime.

Programming

Radio
Southern Cross Austereo produces its own networked programming across both brands, which include:

Some of its stations picked up the Continuous Call Team when Broadcast Operations Group could not resolve broadcast rights issues with 2GB and the National Rugby League. The most notable was Triple M Newcastle, who also picked up rights to cover games of the Newcastle Knights.

Television news

SCA produces regional television news services for its stations affiliated with the Seven Network. Full evening news programs air in Tasmania and the Spencer Gulf and Broken Hill region with short updates airing in remote Central and Eastern Australia and Darwin.

Assets

Radio

Queensland

New South Wales

1. Translators for 2BDR on 90.1 MHz in Omeo and 96.5 MHz in Corryong. There is also a translator for 2AAY in Corryong on 95.7 MHz.
2. Translators on 100.7 MHz (2PQQ) and 102.3 MHz (2ROX) in Port Macquarie.

Australian Capital Territory

Victoria

1. Re-transmitter at 97.9 MHz FM in Traralgon.

Tasmania

South Australia

Western Australia

1. 6TZ also re-transmitted via 1134 kHz AM in Collie (6CI, now listed by the  Australian Communications & Media Authority under 6TZ), and 756 kHz AM in Busselton and the Margaret River region.

Television

New South Wales and the Australian Capital Territory
BDN – Nine Network affiliate, Broken Hill¹
BKN – Seven, Broken Hill¹
CTC – 10 Southern New South Wales/ACT
SCN – 10 Broken Hill¹

Northern Territory and Remote Areas of Eastern Australia
Central Digital Television (CDT) – 10 Central (jointly owned with Imparja Television Pty Ltd)²
DTD – 10 Darwin (jointly owner with the Nine Network)²
QQQ – Seven Central Australia
TND – Seven Darwin

Queensland
IDQ – 10 Central Mount Isa (jointly owned with Imparja Television Pty Ltd)²
ITQ – Seven Mount Isa
TNQ – 10 Queensland

South Australia
GDS – Nine Network affiliate, Spencer Gulf¹
GTS – Seven, Spencer Gulf¹
SGS – 10, Spencer Gulf¹

Victoria
GLV/BCV – 10 Victoria

Tasmania
TDT – Tasmanian Digital Television (jointly owned with WIN Television)²
TNT – Seven Tasmania

1. Southern Cross has a monopoly on commercial television in this market. The services other than GTS and BKN are retransmissions from Adelaide with local advertising.
2. This station was launched as a digital-only service, co-owned by the two existing commercial broadcasters in the market.

Digital radio

Southern Cross Austereo broadcasts a number of digital only radio stations, including:

 Santa Radio (seasonal), first launched for Christmas 2020, billed as a partnership between SCA and North Pole communications playing festive songs picked by Santa and his elves
 Buddha Hits, "pop, electronica and acoustic vibes with a café music feel"
 Easy 80s Hits, up-tempo, sing-along format of mainstream 1980 hits
RnB Fridays, hip-hop and RnB
Dance Hits, dance tunes
Oldskool 90s Hits, pop nostalgia, focused around the 1990s
Kids Hits, kids' music and overnight lullabies
SoundCloud Radio, up and coming and independent artists, in partnership with SoundCloud
 Triple M 90s, 1990s rock music
 Triple M Classic Rock, late 1960s and 1970s
 Triple M Hard 'N' Heavy, metal and hard rock
 Triple M Country, country music from the 1990s to now
 Triple M Soft Rock, soft rock

In 2021 Southern Cross Austereo announced it has invested in content discovery company Sonnant, to add metadata to their digital content

Internet radio
Southern Cross Austereo broadcasts a number of internet radio stations on the LiSTNR platform. The launch of LiSTNR in February 2021 consisted of 15 music stations initially, with plans to add more stations and shows in the future.

Podcasts

They also own and operate the PodcastOne application and hold the rights to all of its podcasts.

Advertising sales

As well as advertising sales for all their own assets they were also in charge of this for the Nine owned and operated NBN TV before the advertising sales were sold to WIN and then Nine Entertainment

Former owned and operated stations
Due to conditions placed upon the takeover of DMG Radio's regional stations in 2005, Macquarie Southern Cross Media had to sell these stations to other parties:

 To Prime Media Group (with most stations being rebranded as "Zinc"):
4CA, Cairns
Sea FM and Mix-FM, Townsville
4MK, Mackay
4RO, Rockhampton
4CC, Rockhampton/Gladstone
 To Ace Radio:
2AY, Albury-Wodonga

Further, due to conditions triggered by the purchase of the assets of Southern Cross Broadcasting, Macquarie Media Group was required to sell further stations to meet further diversity requirements at the time; the transactions to satisfy this being completed on 2008-03-14:

 To Grant Broadcasters:
 Launceston, Tasmania: 7LA (1098 kHz AM)
 Burnie, Tasmania: 7BU "Heart 558" (558 kHz AM), 7SEA "Sea FM" (101.7 MHz FM)
 Scottsdale, Tasmania: 7SD "Heart 540" (540 kHz AM), 7RGS "Sea FM" (99.7 MHz FM)
 Devonport, Tasmania: 7AD "Heart 900" (900 kHz AM), 7DDD "Sea FM" (107.7 MHz FM)
 Queenstown, Tasmania: 7XS "West Coast 7XS" (837 kHz AM), 7AUS "Aus FM" (92.1 MHz FM)
 To Resonate Broadcasting:
 Warragul, Victoria: 3GG (531 kHz AM)
 Charters Towers, Queensland: 4GC (828 kHz AM), 4CHT "Hot FM" (95.9 MHz FM)
 To Smart Radio/Pinecam Pty Ltd (owners of the 4VL licence in Charleville, Queensland):
 Emerald, Queensland: 4HI (1143 kHz AM)
 Kingaroy, Queensland: 4SB "Heart 1071" (1071 kHz AM)
 Mount Isa, Queensland: 4LM (666 kHz AM)
 Roma, Queensland: 4ZR (1476 kHz AM)
 To Broadcast Operations Group:
 Young, New South Wales: 2LF (1350 kHz AM), 2LFF "Star FM" (93.9 MHz FM)
 To Coastal Broadcasters Pty Ltd (owners of the 4KZ licence in Innisfail, Queensland):
 Atherton, Queensland: 4AM (558 kHz AM)

Southern Cross Austereo was made to sell 91.9 Sea FM and 92.7 Mix FM on the Sunshine Coast, due to the larger than allowed overlap between the stations' licence area and that of Brisbane. In 2013, the two stations were sold to Eon Broadcasting.

Controversies

Ownership and control
On 16 February 2006, the Australian Communications & Media Authority commenced an investigation into the ownership of radio stations by Elmie Investments, owned by Stuart Simpson. The investigation revealed that Macquarie Regional RadioWorks had funded $9 million of Simpson's $10 million acquisition of five radio stations from AMI Radio. The radio stations in question – EasyMix Ten-71 Bendigo and EasyMix 1467 Mildura in Victoria, 4EL Cairns and 4AA Mackay in Queensland and, in Western Australia, Easy Mix 621 Bunbury – were located in markets where RadioWorks already controlled two commercial radio licences, and in November 2007 the company was found to be in breach of sections 54 and 56 of the Broadcasting Services Act 1992. The stations had been divested from Elmie Investments before the conclusion of the investigation.

Kyle & Jackie O child rape victim incident
In 2009, 2Day FM were ordered to provide increased protection for children after a 14-year-old girl was attached to a lie detector on the Kyle and Jackie O Show and pressured into discussing her sex life live on air. The radio show host, Kyle Sandilands, encouraged both the girl and her mother to discuss whether she was sexually active, to which the girl responded: "I've already told you the story of this and don't look at me and smile because it's not funny. Oh, okay. I got raped when I was 12 years old."  To which Kyle replied: "Right. And is that, is that the only experience you've had?"

Summer 30 royal hoax call incident

As part of a hoax call to the King Edward VII's Hospital Sister Agnes treating the wife of Prince William for acute morning sickness in the critical first trimester of pregnancy, 2Day DJs –  Mike Christian and Mel Greig – purported to be the Queen and the Prince of Wales. An experienced 46-year-old nurse, Jacintha Saldanha, took the call.  During the call, she and colleagues were conned into revealing sensitive details regarding the patient's condition.

The nurse was found dead the following morning in a suspected suicide at the hospital where she worked.

There is some disagreement over the legality of the incident, with the hospital expressing concern that the incident may have broken the law and Rhys Holleran, the chief executive of 2Day FM's parent company Southern Cross Austereo, stating he was confident that was not the case.

At a Federal Court hearing it became known that Australian media watchdog Australian Communications & Media Authority (ACMA) had prepared a confidential, preliminary report saying that the Radio Royal hoax 'broke law'. 2Day FM acted illegally by airing the phone call without consent.

See also
RadioWorks
American RadioWorks

References

External links
Southern Cross Austereo

Australian radio networks
Southern Cross Media Group
Australian companies established in 2011
Companies listed on the Australian Securities Exchange